Wutthisak Maneesook (born 26 August 1986) is a professional footballer from Thailand. He currently plays for Rayong in the Thai League 2.

References

External links
 Goal.com
 

1986 births
Living people
Wutthisak Maneesook
Wutthisak Maneesook
Association football defenders
Wutthisak Maneesook
Wutthisak Maneesook
Wutthisak Maneesook
Wutthisak Maneesook
Wutthisak Maneesook
Wutthisak Maneesook
Wutthisak Maneesook
Wutthisak Maneesook
Wutthisak Maneesook